Payment in Blood is a crime novel by Elizabeth George. Inspector Lynley and Barbara Havers investigate the murder of a playwright which took place in a remote hotel. On this occasion, the inspector comes into conflict with the principles of the English upper class, of which he himself is a member. 

A German translation by Mechtild Sandberg-Ciletti was published first by Blanvalet in 1991 under the title Keiner werfe den ersten Stein. It was subsequently also published in paperback form by Goldmann.

References 

1989 American novels
American mystery novels
Bantam Books books